Dame Tu Amor may refer to:

 "Dame Tu Amor" (song), a 1986 song by Selena
 Dame Tu Amor (EP), a 1989 EP by Alejandra Guzmán
 "Dame Tu Amor", a 1993 song by Luis Miguel from the album Aries
 "Dame Tu Amor", a 2008 song by Alacranes Musical from the album Tu Inspiración
 "Dame Tu Amor", a 2013 song by Larry Hernandez
 "Dame Tu Amor", a 2012 song by Inna featuring Reik